Dwi Kuswanto (born 16 August 1985) is an Indonesian professional footballer who plays as a goalkeeper for Liga 1 club Borneo.

Honours

Club
Arema
 Indonesia President's Cup: 2017

References

External links
 Dwi Kuswanto at Soccerway
 Dwi Kuswanto at Liga Indonesia

1985 births
Living people
People from Sidoarjo Regency
Sportspeople from East Java
Indonesian footballers
Indonesian Premier Division players
Liga 1 (Indonesia) players
Persibo Bojonegoro players
Deltras F.C. players
Persikabo Bogor players
Persiwa Wamena players
Persisam Putra Samarinda players
Persepam Madura Utama players
Persela Lamongan players
Arema F.C. players
Persikabo 1973 players
Borneo F.C. players
Association football goalkeepers